David A. Barnes House is a historic home located at Murfreesboro, Hertford County, North Carolina.  It was built in 1875, and is a two-story, three bay, Italianate style frame dwelling with a hip-roof.  It is sheathed in weatherboard and features a one-story, hip-roof porch supported by four square-paneled posts with sawn brackets.  Also on the property are the contributing five-hole privy, a kitchen house, and two miscellaneous outbuildings.

It was listed on the National Register of Historic Places in 2014.

References

Houses on the National Register of Historic Places in North Carolina
Italianate architecture in North Carolina
Houses completed in 1875
Houses in Hertford County, North Carolina
National Register of Historic Places in Hertford County, North Carolina
Buildings and structures in Murfreesboro, North Carolina